The 2007–08 Kuwaiti Premier League season is the 46th since its establishment. The first matches of the season were played on 7 December 2007, and the final matchday was on the 4 April 2008.

Al Kuwait won the title for the 3rd successive time.

Current standings
As of 4 April 2008

Top scorers

References

External links 
 goalzz.com - Kuwaiti Premier League

Kuwait Premier League seasons
1
Kuw